Sant Gyaneshwar is a 1964 Bollywood film direct by Manibhai Vyas, starring Sudhir Kumar, Surekha, Babloo and Shahu Modak.

Cast 
 Sudhir Kumar
 Surekha
 Babloo
 Shahu Modak
 Jeevan
 Ulhas
 Sulochana Latkar
 Asit Sen
 Madan Puri
 Bharat Bhushan

Soundtrack 

Music composed by Laxmikant-Pyarelal and lyrics by Bharat Vyas.

 The song "Jyot Se Jyot Jagaate Chalo Prem Ki Ganga Bahaate Chalo" was listed at #3 on Binaca Geetmala annual list 1965.

Awards and nominations 
 Nomination Filmfare Award for Best Lyricist - Bharat Vyas for the song "Jyot Se Jyot Jagaate Chalo Prem Ki Ganga Bahaate Chalo".
 Nomination Filmfare Award for Best Playback Singer - Lata Mangeshkar for the song "Jyot Se Jyot Jagaate Chalo Prem Ki Ganga Bahaate Chalo".

References 

1964 films
1960s Hindi-language films
Films scored by Laxmikant–Pyarelal
Indian historical films
1960s historical films